Atrytonopsis hianna, the dusted skipper, is a butterfly of the family Hesperiidae. It is found in the United States from eastern Wyoming, central Colorado, northern New Mexico and central Texas east to New Hampshire and Massachusetts, south to peninsular Florida and the Gulf Coast.

The wingspan is 32–43 mm. There is one generation with adults on from May to June in the north. In the south there are two generations with adults on wing from March to October in Florida.

The larvae feed on Andropogon gerardi and Schizachyrium scoparium. Adults feed on the nectar from various flowers, including Japanese honeysuckle, wild strawberry, blackberry, wild hyacinth, phlox, vervain and red clover.

Subspecies
Atrytonopsis hianna hianna
Atrytonopsis hianna turneri (Kansas, Oklahoma)

References

External links
Butterflies and Moths of North America

Hesperiini
Butterflies described in 1868
Butterflies of North America
Taxa named by Samuel Hubbard Scudder